Bacchisa laevicollis is a species of beetle in the family Cerambycidae. It was described by Breuning in 1956. It is known from the Philippines.

References

L
Beetles described in 1956